Bishop Auckland is a constituency in County Durham represented in the House of Commons of the UK Parliament since 2019 by Dehenna Davison, a Conservative.

Constituency profile
The constituency is located in an upland, southern part of County Durham in the North East of England. On a more local level, it comprises the whole of the former Teesdale district, and parts of the former Wear Valley district and the former Sedgefield borough.

The constituency includes as its major settlements the towns of Barnard Castle, Middleton-in-Teesdale, Bishop Auckland, Shildon, Spennymoor and its contiguous suburb village, Tudhoe, with their surrounding villages, dales and fields. The seat contains the market town of Bishop Auckland which has a mixed modern and historic high street, the similarly sized Barnard Castle, and large areas used for agriculture, particularly hill farming on the rolling landscape that cuts into the Pennines with substantial livestock. Most housing, many small towns and most facilities were built in the prosperous era of coal mining which brought thousands of workers to live in Bishop Auckland town and neighbouring settlements. Manufacturing, including food processing and packaging, public sector employment, retail and agriculture are the main employers.

Within the seat are Auckland Castle and Park, Lartington Hall, Windlestone Hall, Raby Castle, Binchester Roman Fort (Vinovia), The Bowes Museum, and enclosures and industrial workings on Cockfield Fell.

Boundaries

1885–1918 

 Part of the Sessional Division of Bishop Auckland.

The constituency was created for the 1885 general election by the Redistribution of Seats Act 1885 as one of eight new single-member divisions of the county of Durham, replacing the two 2-member seats of North Durham and South Durham. See map on Vision of Britain website.

1918–1950 

 The Urban Districts of Bishop Auckland and Shildon; and
 part of the Rural District of Auckland.

Gained parts of Barnard Castle, offset by losses to the new constituencies of Sedgefield and Spennymoor.

1950–1955 

 The Urban Districts of Barnard Castle, Bishop Auckland, and Shildon; and
 the Rural District of Barnard Castle.

The urban and rural districts of Barnard Castle transferred from the abolished constituency thereof.

1955–1974 
As above, except the part of the Middridge ward transferred to the Rural District of Darlington by the County of Durham (Parish of Great Aycliffe) Confirmation Order 1952 (Statutory Instrument 1953/741).

1974–1983 

 The Urban Districts of Barnard Castle, Bishop Auckland, and Shildon; and
 the Rural Districts of Barnard Castle and Darlington.

Gained the rural district of Darlington (which contained the new town of Newton Aycliffe) from the abolished constituency of Sedgefield.

1983–1997 

 The District of Wear Valley wards of Bishop Auckland Town, Cockton Hill, Coundon, Coundon Grange, Escomb, Henknowle, St Helen's, West Auckland, and Woodhouse Close;
 the District of Teesdale; and
 the District of Sedgefield wards of Byerley, Middridge, Neville, Shafto, Simpasture, Sunnydale, Thickley, West, and Woodham.

Rural areas around Darlington returned to the re-established Sedgefield constituency.

1997-present 

 The District of Wear Valley wards of Bishop Auckland Town, Cockton Hill, Coundon, Coundon Grange, Escomb, Henknowle, St Helen's, West Auckland, and Woodhouse Close;
 the District of Teesdale; and
 the District of Sedgefield wards of Byerley, Low Spennymoor and Tudhoe Grange, Middlestone, Spennymoor, Sunnydale, Thickley, and Tudhoe.

Gained Spennymoor from Sedgefield in exchange for Newton Aycliffe.

2007 Boundary review 
Following a review of parliamentary representation in County Durham in 2007, the Boundary Commission for England made no changes to the Bishop Auckland constituency. In the 2009 structural changes to local government in England, the local authority districts in Durham were abolished and replaced with a single unitary authority; however, this has not affected the boundaries of the constituency.

Members of Parliament

Elections

History of modern results 

From 1935 to 2017 inclusive, the seat's voters returned MPs from the Labour Party; the former Labour Chancellor of the Exchequer Hugh Dalton, was the MP for Bishop Auckland from 1929 to 1931, and after regaining the seat in 1935, remained an MP until 1959. The 2019 result returned a Conservative; the party's results had shown an increase from election to election from 1997 onwards.

Elections in the 2010s

Elections in the 2000s

Elections in the 1990s

Elections in the 1980s

Elections in the 1970s

Elections in the 1960s

Elections in the 1950s

Elections in the 1940s

Elections in the 1930s

Elections in the 1920s

Elections in the 1910s

Election results 1885–1918

Elections in the 1880s

Elections in the 1890s

Elections in the 1900s

Elections in the 1910s 

General Election 1914–15:

Another General Election was required to take place before the end of 1915. The political parties had been making preparations for an election to take place and by July 1914, the following candidates had been selected; 
Liberal: Vickerman Rutherford
Unionist: Richard George Tyndall Bright
Labour: Ben Spoor

See also
List of parliamentary constituencies in County Durham
History of parliamentary constituencies and boundaries in Durham
Bishop Auckland by-election, 1929

Notes

References

Sources 

Parliamentary constituencies in County Durham
Constituencies of the Parliament of the United Kingdom established in 1885
Bishop Auckland